Derek John Ashley (born 22 January 1956) is a former English first-class cricketer. Ashley was a right-handed batsman who fielded as a wicket-keeper. He was born in Whitchurch, Shropshire, educated at Whitchurch Secondary Modern School and played club level for Whitchurch and Shrewsbury Cricket Clubs.

Ashley made his debut for Shropshire in the 1982 Minor Counties Championship against Staffordshire. Ashley played Minor counties cricket for Shropshire from 1982 to 1991, which included 74 Minor Counties Championship appearances and 15 MCCA Knockout Trophy appearances. He made his List A debut against Somerset in the 1983 NatWest Trophy. He made 5 further List A appearances, the last of which came against Leicestershire in the 1989 NatWest Trophy. In his 6 List A matches, he scored 36 runs at an average of 9.00, with a high score of 13. Behind the stumps he took 6 catches and made a single stumping.

He made a single first-class appearance for the Minor Counties cricket team against the touring New Zealanders. He scored 4 runs in the Minor Counties first-innings, before being dismissed by Evan Gray. In their second-innings, Ashley was dismissed for a duck by Brian Barrett. Although he did not take any catches in the match, he did make a single stumping, stumping Jeff Crowe off the bowling of Steve Plumb.

References

External links
Derek Ashley at ESPNcricinfo
Derek Ashley at CricketArchive

1956 births
Living people
People from Whitchurch, Shropshire
English cricketers
Shropshire cricketers
Minor Counties cricketers
Wicket-keepers